Myelodes flavimargo is a species of snout moth in the genus Myelodes. It was described by George Hampson in 1930. It is found in Lesotho and South Africa.

References

Moths described in 1930
Phycitinae